The Roman Catholic Suburbicarian Diocese of Velletri–Segni is one of the suburbicarian dioceses, Catholic dioceses in Italy close to Rome with a special status and a cardinal bishop, the bishop of Velletri–Segni. Historically, the see of Velletri was combined with the see of Ostia from 1060 to 1914.

The cathedral in the city of Velletri is dedicated to Saint Clement.

Segni was a small town, a former Roman colony, sited approximately halfway between Rome and Montecassino. In the 12th century, the diocese possessed only seven castelli, 37 churches, 3 chapels, and 3 cloisters.

Separation of Ostia and Velletri

By the beginning of the 20th century, it had become apparent to the papacy that the suburbicarian bishops had become overburdened with the responsibilities of their curial and diocesan duties. The increase in commerce, in roads and travel, and the migration of people to the city, as well as the increased burden of duties in the papal administration because of the mass and complexity of problems affecting the Church, made some sort of relief necessary. On his own initiative, therefore, Pope Pius X issued a decree, Apostolicae Romanorum Pontificium, granting the bishops of Ostia, Porto, Palestrina, and Frascati each a suffragan bishop to carry the burden of their pastoral duties in their dioceses. The diocese of Velletri is stated to already have a suffragan bishop, whose poweres were also augmented and regulated by Apostolicae Romanorum Pontificium. The pope appointed the suffragans, who had full powers inside the diocese, subject to the cardinal's approval, but not the power to ordain or consecrate, or the right to have a throne or display their coat-of-arms.

In 1914, Pius X took steps to regulate the irregularities in the incomes of the six cardinal suburbicarian bishops. On is own initiative, after consulting with the curial cardinals and with their agreement, he issued the decree Edita a Nobis, in which he ordered that in the future the incomes of the cardinal bishops should be placed in a single fund, administered by the Office of Economic Affairs, to which each cardinal must render an annual account. Each year, after 6,000 Lire was to be given to each suffragan bishop, the remaining money collected was to be divided into equal portions, the bishop of Ostia to receive two portions, and each of the other bishops one portion. The decree also ordered that the bishop of Ostia, when promoted to that position, should also retain his previous bishopric; the diocese of Velitrae was to be removed from his jurisdiction, and from that point the suburbicarin bishops would be: Ostiensis, Portuensis et Sanctae Rufinae, Albanensis, Praenestina, Sabinensis, Tusculana, Veliterna.

Joining of Velletri and Segni
In 1981, the Diocese of Velletri was combined with the Diocese of Segni.

The Cardinal-Bishop is now the titular bishop of the diocese, while the diocesan bishop administers the diocese.

Reorganization of dioceses 
In a decree of the Second Vatican Council, it was recommended that dioceses be reorganized to take into account modern developments. A project begun on orders from Pope John XXIII, and continued under his successors, was intended  to reduce the number of dioceses in Italy and to rationalize their borders in terms of modern population changes and shortages of clergy. The change was made urgent because of changes made to the Concordat between the Italian State and the Holy See on 18 February 1984, and embodied in a law of 3 June 1985. The change was approved by Pope John Paul II in an audience of 27 September 1986, and by a decree of the Sacred Congregation of Bishops on 30 September 1986. The diocese of Segni was united to the diocese of Velletri. Its name was to be Dioecesis Veliterna-Signina. The seat of the diocese was to be in Velletri. The former cathedral in Segni was to have the honorary title of co-cathedral, and its Chapter was to be called the Capitulum Concathedralis. There was to be only one episcopal curia, one seminary, one ecclesiastical tribunal; and all the clergy were to be incardinated in the diocese of Velletri-Segni. The territory of the diocese was to be the same as the two dioceses combined.

The bishop of Velletri-Segni, Msgr. Marin Gomiero, was given the powers to carry out the papal decree.

Bishops of Velletri and of Segni

Bishops of Velletri (465–1060)

 Adeodatus, 465
 Bonifatius,  487
 Silvinus, 501
 vacant
 John I, 592
 Potentinus, 649
 Placentinus, 680
 John II, 721
 Gratiosus (Grosso), 743
 Gratian, 761
 Citonatus, 761–769 (Bishop of Porto, 769)
 Gregory I, 769–775 (Bishop of Santa Rufina, 761–769)
 Theodore, 780
 Gregory II 826–853
 John III, 853–867
Gaudericus of Velletri, 867–879
 John IV, 896–898
 Leo I 946–963
 Theobaldo 996–1027
 Leo II, 1032–1038
 Amato, 1044
 Johannes 1050
 Benedictus 1057
Johannes Mincius (1058–1060)

 United with Ostia in April 1060

Bishops of Ostia and Velletri (1060–1915)

to 1378
Sources for the period 1057–1130: Klewitz (1957), and Hüls (1977). For the period 1130–81: J.M.Brixius.

 Peter Damian, 1060–1072
 Gerald of Ostia, 1072–1077
 Odo I de Lagery, 1080–1088 (became Pope Urban II)
 Odo II, ca.1088–1102
 Leo of Ostia, ca.1106–1115
 Lamberto Scannabecchi, 1116–1124 (later Pope Honorius II)
 Giovanni of Camaldoli, 1126–1133/35,
 Drogo de Champagne, 1136–1138
 Alberic, 1138–1148
 Guido II de Summa, 1149–1151
 Hugo, 1151–1158
 Ubaldo Allucingoli, 1159–1181/84 (became Pope Lucius III in 1181)
 Theobald, 1184–1188
 Ottaviano di Paoli, 1189–1206
 Ugolino di Conti 1206–1227/31 (became Pope Gregory IX)
 Rinaldo dei Signori di Ienne, 1231–1254/61 (became Pope Alexander IV in 1254)
 Hugh of Saint-Cher 1261–1262
 Enrico Bartolomei 1262–1271
vacant 1271–1273
 Peter VI de Tarentaise, 1273–1276 (later Pope Innocent V, † 1276)
 vacant 1276–1278
 Latino Malabranca Orsini, 1278–1294
 Hugh Aycelin, 1294–1297
 Leonardo Patrasso, apostolic administrator 1298–1299
 Niccolo I Boccasini, 1300–1303 (became Pope Benedict XI)
 Niccolò Alberti, 1303–1321
 Regnaud de la Porte, 1321–1325
vacant 1325–1327
 Bertrand du Pouget, 1327–1352
 Étienne Aubert, 1352
 Pierre Bertrand du Colombier, 1353–1361
 Andouin Aubert, 1361–1363
 Elie de Saint Yrieux, 1363–1367
 Guillaume de la Sudrie, 1367–1373
 Peter d'Esteing, 1373–1377
 Bertrand Lagier, O.Min., 1378 (Avignon Obedience)

The western schism: Rome
vacant 1378–1388
 Philippe of Alençon, 1388–1397
 Angelo Acciaioli, 1397–1408 
vacant 1408–1415

The western schism: Avignon
(after 1415 restricted to Peñíscola)
 Bertrand Lagier, 1378–1392
 John de Neufchatel, 1392–1398
 Leonardo Rossi da Giffoni, 1398–1405
 Jean-Allarmet de Brogny, 1405–1408
vacant 1408–1423
Julian Lobera y Valtierra, 1423–1429 (restricted to Peñíscola)

The western schism: Pisa
 Jean-Allarmet de Brogny, 1409–1415
 Jean-Allarmet de Brogny, 1415–1426

Since the end of the schism

 Antonio Correr, 1431–1445
 Juan de Cervantes, 1447–1453
 Giorgio Fieschi, 1455–1461
 Guillaume d'Estouteville, 1461–1483
 Giuliano della Rovere, 1483–1503, (became Pope Julius II)
 Oliviero Carafa, 1503–1511
 Raffaele Riario Sansoni, 1511–1521
 Bernardino Lopez de Carvajal, 1521–1523
 Francesco Soderini 1523–1524 
 Niccolò Fieschi 1524
 Alessandro Farnese 1524–1534 (became Pope Paul III) 
 Giovanni Piccolomini, 1535–1537
 Giovanni Domenico de Cupis, 1537–1553
 Giovanni Pietro Carafa, 1553–1555 (became Pope Paul IV)  
 Jean du Bellay 1555–1560
 François de Tournon, 1560–1562
 Rodolfo Pio de Carpi, 1562–1564
 Francesco Pisani, 1564–1570
 Giovanni Morone, 1570–1580
 Alessandro Farnese, 1580–1589
 Giovanni Antonio Serbelloni, 1589–1591 
 Alfonso Gesualdo de Conza, 1591–1603
 Tolomeo Gallio, 1603–1607 
 Domenico Pinelli, 1607–1611
 François de Joyeuse, 1611–1615
 Antonio Maria Galli, 1615–1620
 Antonio Maria Sauli, 1620–1623
 Francesco Maria Bourbon del Monte, 1623–1626
 Ottavio Bandini, 1626–1629
 Giovanni Battista Deti, 1629–1630
 Domenico Ginnasi, 1630–1639
 Carlo Emanuele Pio di Savoia, 1639–1641
 Marcello Lante della Rovere, 1641–1652
 Carlo I de Medici, 1652–1666
 Francesco V Barberini, 1666–1679
 Cesare Facchinetti, 1680–1683
 Niccolò Albergati-Ludovisi, 1683–1687
 Alderano Cybo, 1687–1700 
 Emmanuel Théodose de la Tour d'Auvergne, 1700–1715
 Nicola Acciaoiuli, 1715–1719
 Fulvio Astalli, 1719–1721
 Sebastiano Antonio Tanara, 1721–1724
 Francesco del Giudice, 1724–1725
 Fabrizio Paolucci, 1725–1726 
 Francesco Barberini, 1726–1738
 Pietro Ottoboni, 1738–1740
 Tommaso Ruffo, 1740–1753
 Pietro Luigi Carafa, 1753–1755
 Rainiero d'Elci, 1755–1761
 Giuseppe Spinelli, 1761–1763
 Carlo Alberto Guidoboni Cavalchini, 1763–1774
 Fabrizio Serbelloni, 1774–1775
 Giovanni Francesco Albani, 1775–1803
 Henry Benedict Stuart, 1803–1807
 Leonardo II Antonelli, 1807–1811
 Alessandro Mattei, 1814–1820
 Giulio Maria della Somaglia, 1820–1830
 Bartolomeo Pacca, 1830–1844
 Lodovico Micara, 1844–1847
 Vincenzo Macchi, 1847–1860
 Mario Mattei, 1860–1870
 Costantino Patrizi Naro, 1870–1876
 Luigi Amat di San Filippo e Sorso, 1877–1878
 Camillo di Pietro, 1878–1884
 Carlo Sacconi, 1884–1889
 Raffaele Monaco La Valletta, 1889–1896
 Luigi Oreglia di Santo Stefano, 1896–1913
 Serafino Vannutelli, 1913–1914

Bishops of Velletri (1914–1981)

Diomede Falconio, 1914–1917
Basilio Pompili, 1917–1931
Bonaventura Cerretti, 1933
Enrico Gasparri, 1933–1946
Clemente Micara, 1946–1965
Fernando Cento, 1965–1973
Ildebrando Antoniutti, 1973–1974
Sebastiano Baggio, 1974–1981

Bishops of Segni (494–1981)

 Santulus, 494-499
 Justus, 501-504
 Julianus, 551
 Albinus, 649
 Gaudiosus, 678-679
 Joannes, 721-745
 Jordanus, 769
 Hadrianus, 826
 Theodorus (Theodosius) c. 830
 Bonipertus, 853
 Joannes (II), 861-879
 Stephanus, 963-984
 Robertus, 1015–1036
 Erasmus, 1059–1071
 Bruno of Segni, 1079–1123
 Trasmundus, 1123–1138
 Joannes (III), c. 1138–1178
 Petrus (I), 1179–1206
 J... (attested 1207)
 Bernardus, (c. 1230)
 Bartholomaeus (I), (attested 1254–1264)
 Joannes (IV), 1264
 Petrus (II), 1281–1285
 Bartholomaeus (II), 1289
 Petrus de Brunaco, 1291–1291
 Jacobus (I), 1291–1303
 Petrus (IV), 1303–1320
 Bartholomaeus (III), 1320–1333
 Arnoldus, 1333–1345
 Guilielmus, 1345–1346
 Petrus Vera, 1346–1347
 Guilielmus Ribati, 1348
 Michael Matthaei, O.Carm. 1348
 Sixtus de Ferentino, O.Min. (Avignon Obedience), 1381
 Thomas c. 1381–1395 (Roman Obedience)
 Antonius, O.Min. (Roman Obedience) 1395–1402
 Nicolaus, 1402–1418
 Georgius, 1418–1427
 Nicolaus de Aspra, 1427
 Gregorius Nardi, 1427-1429
 Galganus Bucci de Verulis, 1429–1434
 Jacobus Zancati, 1434–1435
 Joannes (V), 1435
 Ludovicus, 1436–1443
 Petrus Antonius Petrucci, 1445
 Silvester de Pianca, 1456
 Panhutius de Conti,  1468–1481
 Lucius Fazini "Fosforo", 1482–1503
 Vincentius de Maffei, 1503–1507?
 Ludovicus de Viterbio 1507–1527
 Laurentius Grana, 1528–1539
 Sebastiano Graziani, 1539–1541
 Bernardinus Callini, O.Min.Obs., 1541–1549
 Carolus Traversari, 1549–1552
 Ambrosius Monticoli, 1551–1569
 Giuseppe Pamphilj, O.E.S.A., 1570–1581
 Jacobus Masini, 1581–1602
 Antonius Guerreschi, O.Min.Conv., 1603–1605
 Johannes Ludovicus Pasolini, 1606–1625
 Ludovicus de Actis, 1625–1632
 Octavius Orsini 1632,–1640
 Franciscus Romulus Mileti, 1640–1643
 Andreas Borgia, 1643–1655
 Guarnierius Guarnieri, 1655–1682
Sede vacante, 1682–1684
 Francesco Maria Giannotti, 1684–1699
 Horatius Minimi, 1699–1701
 Petrus Corbelli, 1701–1708
 Michael Ellis, O.S.B., 1708–1726
 Johannes Franciscus Bisleti, 1726–1749
 Fredericus Muschi, 1749–1755
 Caesar Crescentio de Angelis, 1755–1765
 Andreas Spani, 1766–1784
 Paulus Ciotti, 1784–1819
 Franciscus Stracchini, 1819–1823
 Petrus Antonius Luciani, 1824–1840
 Jacobus Traversi, 1841–1845
 Johannes Pellei, 1845–1847
 Ludovicus Ricci, 1847–1877
 Antonius Maria Testa, 1877–1883
 Blasius (Biagio) Sibilia, 1883–1893
 Costantinus Costa, 1893–1897
 Pancrazio Giorgi 1898–1915
 Angelo Maria Filippo Sinibaldi, 1915–1928
 Alfonso Marie de Sanctis, 1928–1933
 Fulvio Tessaroli, 1933–1952
 Pietro Severi, 1953–1957
 Luigi Maria Carli, 1957–1973
 Dante Bernini, 1975–1981

Bishops of Velletri-Segni (since 1981)

Cardinal-Bishops of Velletri-Segni

 Sebastiano Baggio, 1981–1993
 Joseph Ratzinger, 1993–2005 (became Pope Benedict XVI)
 Francis Arinze, since 2005

Diocesan Bishops of Velletri-Segni

 Dante Bernini, 1981–1982 (Diocesan Bishop of Velletri and also of Segni, 1975–1981)
 Martino Gomiero, 1982–1988
 Andrea Maria Erba, 1988–2006
 Vincenzo Apicella, 2006–2022
 Stefano Russo, 2022–present

Notes and references

Bibliography
Borgia, Alessandro (1723). Storia della Chiesa, e citta di Velletri descritta in quattro libri.  Velletri: per Antonio Mariotti 1723.

Brixius, Johann Matthias (1912). Die Mitglieder des Kardinalkollegiums voin 1130–1181 , Berlin: R. Trenkel 1912.
Cappelletti, Giuseppe (1844). Le chiese d'Italia. Volume primo.  Venezia: Giuseppe Antonelli, pp. 454–464; 465-487.

 

 
Hüls, Rudolf (1977). Kardinäle, Klerus und Kirchen Roms: 1049-1130 , Tübingen: Max Niemeyer 1977.
Jaffé, Philipp, Regesta Pontificum Romanorum ab condita ecclesia ad annum p. Chr. n. 1198 ; 2nd ed. by S. Löwenfeld, F. Kaltenbrunner, P. Ewald Vol 1. Leipzig, 1888.

Klewitz, Hans-Walter (1957). Reformpapsttum und Kardinalkolleg , Darmstadt 1957.
Lanzoni, Francesco (1927). Le diocesi d'Italia dalle origini al principio del secolo VII (an. 604).   Faenza: F. Lega, pp. 145–147. 

 (in Latin)

Schwartz, Gerhard (1907). Die Besetzung der Bistümer Reichsitaliens unter den sächsischen und salischen Kaisern: mit den Listen der Bischöfe, 951-1122.  Leipzig: B.G. Teubner. pp. 275–277.

External links
Suburbicarian Diocese of Velletri-Segni Official Website

Roman Catholic bishops in Italy by diocese
Velletri-Segni
Diocese
1981 establishments in Italy